Annum sacrum (meaning Holy Year) is an encyclical by Pope Leo XIII on the consecration of the entire world to the Sacred Heart of Jesus. It was delivered in Saint Peter's Basilica in Rome on the 25th day of May, 1899, the twenty-second year of his pontificate.

History
Annum sacrum was published on 25 May 1899, in anticipation of the Holy Year declared for 1900 to usher in the twentieth century.

When the Church, in the days immediately succeeding her institution, was oppressed beneath the yoke of the Caesars, a young Emperor saw in the heavens across, which became at once the happy omen and cause of the glorious victory that soon followed. And now, to-day, behold another blessed and heavenly tokenis offered to our sight-the most Sacred Heart of Jesus, with a cross rising from it and shining forth with dazzling splendor amidst flames of love. [...] there is in the Sacred Heart a symbol and a sensible image of the infinite love of Jesus Christ which moves us to love one another...

The consecration of the human race to the Sacred Heart of Jesus was a response to numerous demands that had been addressed to Pope Pius IX over 25 years. The motive of consecration is the need for the faithful to reciprocate God’s love for His creation, especially for man. The consecration in the encyclical entered new theological territory by consecrating non-Christians.

His empire extends not only over Catholic nations and those who, having been duly washed in the waters of holy baptism, belong of right to the Church, although erroneous opinions keep them astray, or dissent from her teaching cuts them off from her care; it comprises also all those who are deprived of the Christian faith, so that the whole human race is most truly under the power of Jesus Christ. [...] Such an act of consecration, since it can establish or draw tighter the bonds which naturally connect public affairs with God, gives to States a hope of better things.

The encyclical, and the consecration, were influenced by two letters written to the pope by Sister Mary of the Divine Heart Droste zu Vischering who stated that in visions of Jesus Christ she had been told to request the consecration.

The encyclical includes the Prayer of Consecration to the Sacred Heart of Jesus composed by Pope Leo XIII.

Influence
According to Russell Hittinger, more subsequent encyclicals were written referencing Annum sacrum than the better known ''Rerum novarum".

Leo XIII unites the Kingship of Christ with devotion to the Sacred Heart.  "For He who is the Only-begotten Son of God the Father, having the same substance with Him and being the brightness of His glory and the figure of His substance (Hebrews i., 3) necessarily has everything in common with the Father, and therefore sovereign power over all things."  In addition to this natural right of sovereignty, he also acquired the right by his universally redemptive suffering and death.

Beginning with the encyclical, popes begin to speak more of Christ's ruling powers.

Principles
 The whole human race is most truly under the power of Jesus Christ.(#3)

See also

 Alliance of the Hearts of Jesus and Mary
 List of encyclicals of Pope Leo XIII
 Sacred Heart of Jesus
 Ubi arcano Dei consilio

Notes

Sources

External links
 Pope John Paul II. "Message for the Centenary of the Consecration of the Human Race to the Sacred Heart of Jesus", L'Osservatore Romano, Weekly Edition in English, 23 June 1999, p.1

Encyclicals of Pope Leo XIII
1899 documents
1899 in Christianity
May 1899 events